Soldaten is a 1930 opera in 3 acts by Manfred Gurlitt after the play of Jakob Michael Reinhold Lenz. It was premiered 9 November 1930, Düsseldorf, but later overshadowed by Bernd Alois Zimmermann's setting of Die Soldaten (1965).

Recordings
Soldaten, Burt, Wesener, Barainsky, Müller, Mohr, Rundfunkchor Berlin, Deutsches SO Berlin, Gerd Albrecht 1998 Orfeo

References

1930 operas
German-language operas
Operas by Manfred Gurlitt
Operas
Operas based on plays